Kingstown Radio is a hospital radio station founded in 1961 and based in Kingston upon Hull, England, broadcasting on 1350 kHz (AM), to patient's bedside Hospedia systems and via the local NHS intranet across the Hull and East Yorkshire NHS Trust. It is a registered charity. Broadcasting music, news, sport and health information to staff and patients, its Hull City live commentaries were partially popular beyond its usual audiences, alongside BBC Radio Humberside it was the only station broadcasting these games live.  

Former volunteer presenters include Jon Culshaw, a popular comedian, and James Hoggarth, who later joined BBC Radio Humberside and more recently became their music editor. 

The station has been at more than one site during its history, but for many years, Kingstown Radio was based at Hull Royal Infirmary, sharing a building with flats for nurses and doctors upstairs from the studio. However in 2021, the studio building was pulled down with short notice of only a few weeks; as of August 2022 the station is no longer broadcasting and is currently seeking a new studio space to move to, with the station unable to find a site at Hull Royal Infirmary due to the COVID-19 pandemic.

Backpage Sport
"Backpage Sport" was the name of a sports magazine programme which aired in the 1990s on Tyne Tees Television and is also the name of Manx Radio's sports programme.

Achievements
In 2007, Kingstown Radio won the Silver Award for Sports Output, and four commendations for presentation and production at the Hospital Broadcasting Awards, held in Northampton, particularly for its coverage of Hull City home matches presented by Louise Pitts and Stuart Miles.

See also
 Hospital Broadcasting Association

References

Kingstown Radio Celebrated 50 Years of Broadcasting
Kingstown Radio Off-Air Appeal

External links
 P Squared Radio Automation
 Dave Langer Jingle Site
 "Kingstown's Off-Air Appeal", Hull Daily Mail, 5 July 2013 (Hospital Service needs support to get back up and running) 

Hospital radio stations
Mass media in Kingston upon Hull
Radio stations in Yorkshire
Radio stations established in 1961
1961 establishments in England